IEC is the International Electrotechnical Commission.

IEC may also refer to:

Businesses and organisations
 Independent Electrical Contractors, a U.S. trade association
 An independent ethics committee
  Institute of Catalan Studies (Institut d'Estudis Catalans)
 International Engineering Public Company Limited, a Thai company
 Interstate Economic Committee, a Soviet committee
 Israel Electric Corporation
 Itumbiara Esporte Clube, a Brazilian football club

In science and technology
 IEC connectors, electrical connectors
 IEC bus, for Commodore computers
 Inertial electrostatic confinement, in fusion energy
 Interactive evolutionary computation
 Ion exchange chromatography, a laboratory technique

Other uses
 Island Eastern Corridor, an expressway in Hong Kong

See also